The Ring Rail Line (formerly Marjarata) is a railway route in the area of the city of Vantaa, in the Greater Helsinki Metropolitan Area of Finland. It connects Helsinki-Vantaa Airport and the adjacent Aviapolis business and retail district to the Helsinki commuter rail network. The line fills the gap between Vantaankoski and Tikkurila railway stations, travelling in tunnel underneath the airport.

The line started operating on 1 July 2015.

History 

The founding stone of the line was laid on 3 March 2009, and construction was started on 13 May 2009 with the excavation of service tunnels. The excavation of a 300 m long tunnel station under the airport was completed in March 2010, as the construction was proceeding on schedule.

In February 2011, a video on the project's official website stated that the project would be open by June 2014. It announced various new details, including that the station at Tikkurila would be entirely rebuilt as an integrated travel centre, as well as details on the trains that would serve the airport.  In September 2012, the opening date was pushed back to July 2015, due to the unexpected need to re-design and reinforce the airport station tunnel to withstand the acidic products of propylene glycol decay by bacteria within the ground. Propylene glycol is used as a de-icing agent for the planes.

The Ring Rail Line started operating on 1 July 2015. The station at the Helsinki Airport opened later, with the Tietotie entrance opening on 10 July and the direct connection to the terminal opening in December 2015.

Route

The new line creates a connection from the airport to Helsinki Central railway station, as well as the suburban areas on the route. The new railway leaves the mainline going north from Helsinki after Tikkurila station in the east, travel via the airport and into Vantaankoski station to the west, joining the existing the branch line for western Vantaa which was previously served by the "M" train.  Five new stations were built, with space reserved for three more in the future.

The line is served by the "P" and "I" trains which travel the ring clockwise and anticlockwise respectively. The journey time from the airport to Helsinki Central Railway Station is 27 minutes ("P" train) or 32 minutes ("I" train), whilst the time to Tikkurila, to connect with long-distance trains going north or east, is 8 minutes. Both trains operate every 10 minutes in the daytime.

Stations 

In the first phase, five new stations were built at Vehkala, Kivistö, Aviapolis, Helsinki-Vantaa Airport and Leinelä. Out of these, the Aviapolis and Airport stations are located in a tunnel. Reservations have been made for three additional stations: Petas (surface), Viinikkala (tunnel) and Ruskeasanta (tunnel).

Cost
The projected cost of the construction is €655 million as of September 2012, up from €605 million in March 2010. The estimated cost of the project in December 2014 was €738.5 million. The current estimated cost of the project is €773.8 million

Future development 
Separate proposals exist to extend the Helsinki Metro to the airport, and to move long-distance services from the current main North-South corridor to a new railway between Pasila and Kerava, passing through the airport. This new route, known as Lentorata, would travel in a long tunnel under the airport and allow direct access from long-distance trains, as well as free the rail capacity taken up by long-distance traffic in the current main corridor for the increasing local commuter traffic.

See also 
 Helsinki City Rail Loop
 Jokeri light rail
 Länsimetro
 Lentorata

References

External links

 Finnish Transport Agency > Projects > Under construction > Ring Rail Line 

Railway lines in Finland
Transport in Vantaa
5 ft gauge railways in Finland
Railway tunnels in Finland
Airport rail links
Railway lines opened in 2015
2015 establishments in Finland
Underground commuter rail
Buildings and structures completed in 2015